Bondi Junction is an eastern suburb of Sydney, in the state of New South Wales, Australia. It is 6 kilometres east of the Sydney central business district and is part of the local government area of Waverley.

Bondi Junction is a largely commercial area which has undergone many changes since the late 20th century. There have been many major commercial and residential developments around the main street and surrounding area, notably a new bus/rail interchange and large shopping mall. Many of the original pubs have been maintained, notably, the Nelson Hotel, so named because of its location on Nelson Street.

Bondi Beach is a neighbouring suburb to the east with a world-famous beach. Bondi and North Bondi are also neighbouring suburbs.

Bondi Junction and the neighbouring area is well known for its famous rugby league team, the Sydney Roosters, still officially known as the Eastern Suburbs District Rugby League Football Club. The clubhouse of the team is centrally located in Spring Street, Bondi Junction.

History

Bondi is an Aboriginal word meaning water breaking over rocks. It has been spelt a number of different ways over time: for example, Boondi, Bundi and Bundye.

The first house in the area was Waverley House, which was built by Barnett Levey in 1827, on the current site of Waverley Street. The house changed hands many times over the years before finally being demolished in 1904. When Waverley Municipality was proclaimed in 1859, the name was taken from Waverley House.

Henry Hough was first given a grant of land on the site of Bondi Junction in 1832. On his estate, he built a wind-powered flour mill. This was accessed by a track leading off the South Head Road (now Oxford Street), the suburb's main thoroughfare.

In 1854, the first hotel in the area opened. It was named The Waverley Tea Gardens and the surrounding area quickly took that name, quickly shortened to simply "Tea Gardens", which stuck for the next 30 years. By 1878 steam had supplanted wind in milling and the estate was closed. In May 1881 it was subdivided. Streets in this subdivision that exist today are Mill Hill Road and Hough Street. The subdivision of the estate coincided with the opening of the first tramway to the area – steam trams began operation from Taylor Square in Darlinghurst on 12 March 1881.

With the extension of the tram lines to Bondi Beach, Charing Cross and Bronte later in the decade, the term Bondi Junction was coined. It referred to the junction of the Bondi and Bronte tram lines at the corner of the now Oxford Street and Bronte Road.

With the subdivision of surrounding suburbs complete by 1930, Bondi Junction quickly grew into a major entertainment and commercial centre. Tram lines ran to Bondi Beach via Birriga Road, Bondi Beach via Bondi Road, Bronte Beach and The Spot, Randwick and the City at Circular Quay and Central railway station. A tram depot was established on the corner of South Head Road (renamed Oxford Street with the completion of widening works in Darlinghurst) and the present day York Road. Oxford Street quickly became crowded and congested. By the 1960s traffic was at the point that Bondi Junction was one of the worst bottlenecks in Sydney.

The suburb was historically divided by the border of Waverley and Woollahra councils. In 2002 the boundary was realigned from Oxford Street to the bypass road (see below), giving Waverley Council full control of the commercial areas of the suburb.

Transport
Bondi Junction railway station is an underground station that is also the eastern terminus of the Eastern Suburbs railway line on the Sydney Trains network. The station is also the terminus of limited South Coast Line services. A bus interchange is located at ground level, above the railway station and below residential towers.

The Sydney tram network was closed in 1961 and the Waverley Tram Depot converted to a bus depot. This temporarily reduced the traffic problem in the area ; but, the rise of the private motor vehicle soon made the problem acute. A railway to Sydney's eastern suburbs was first proposed by John Young, Mayor of Sydney in the 1870s. This was subsequently incorporated into the Bradfield Scheme for improving Sydney's railways. The line was never built as Bradfield envisaged, however.

In 1976, with construction of the railway underway and the NSW Government resolving to actually complete the project as far as Bondi Junction, construction was also begun on an elevated freeway-standard bypass of Bondi Junction. The Bondi Junction Bypass (later renamed Syd Einfeld Drive after the notable local man and one-time Member for Phillip), unlike the railway, was constructed quickly, opening on 6 January 1979. The road runs around the northern side of the business district from Oxford Street at Ocean Street to Oxford Street at Bondi Road and is elevated at about five metres above the ground. It is constructed as a continuous concrete plank bridge. The freeway is, in fact, the only section ever built of a much longer planned road known as the Eastern Freeway, a proposed freeway abandoned in the 1960s, which would have travelled between the Sydney CBD and Bondi.

With the railway opening in June 1979, major changes to traffic flow were made in Bondi Junction. The main thoroughfare, Oxford Street, became devoted to buses only between Adelaide Street and Bronte Road and a pedestrian mall was created between Bronte Road and Newland Street, known as Bondi Junction Mall. The opening of the railway provided the opportunity to rationalise bus services in the Eastern Suburbs, with most city services eliminated or terminated at the new Bondi Junction Bus–Rail Interchange. Due to cost cutting, the pedestrian mall, bus–rail interchange, and indeed the railway station itself were of poor design and construction. Nonetheless, the popularity of the railway was manifest and Bondi Junction interchange became the largest suburban bus terminus in Australia.

In 1998, Woollahra Council, which controlled the site of the bus interchange, finalised an agreement to sell the airspace above the site to Meriton Apartments. Construction began in April 1999 for a new bus interchange and two residential apartment towers of over 70 m high. While this took place, upgrade works were also performed on Bondi Junction railway station. The new interchange was tentatively opened in September 2000 for the Sydney Olympics but subsequently closed for further work. The new bus interchange opened in July 2001. In 2003, Waverley Council upgraded the Oxford Street pedestrian mall and embarked on a general upgrade of streets and footpaths in the commercial area.

Economy

Retail and shopping 

Westfield Bondi Junction is a major mid to upmarket shopping centre opposite Bondi Junction railway station on the corner of Grosvenor and Oxford Street. There are also two smaller shopping centre nearby, Eastgate Bondi Junction located below the Eastgate residential apartment development and a shopping centre above the station and bus interchange known as Meriton Retail Precinct Bondi Junction. Oxford Street is a major commercial centre in Bondi Junction as it contains numerous businesses including hotels and shops from the York Street end to Old South Head Road. Oxford Street Mall is a pedestrian zone between Bronte Road and Newland Street and contains numerous shops and cafes. There are also shops along Spring Street, Ebley Street and Bronte Road.

High-density developments and housing

Bondi Junction is Sydney's fifth largest business district behind the CBD itself, North Sydney, Parramatta and Chatswood. Typical development in the commercial area consists of strip-mall type development two or three levels high. However, over the last 35 years, at least twenty buildings of 12 levels or higher have been constructed including Bondi Junction Private Hospital

The first large development was the Eastern Suburbs Leagues Club (Easts), the local rugby league club for the Eastern Suburbs Roosters.

In the 1980s, following the completion of the Eastern Suburbs Railway, commercial development reached a peak with several office buildings built in the centre of Bondi Junction. By the 1990s these were mostly displaced by residential developments.

Bondi Junction features high density residential developments close to the commercial centre and low density housing further away. Domestic architecture includes Victorian and Federation designs.

Demographics
According to the 2016 census of Population, there were 9,445 residents in Bondi Junction. In Bondi Junction, 40.8% of people were born in Australia. The next most common countries of birth were England 6.7%, Ireland 3.2%, New Zealand 2.9%, Brazil 2.6% and China 2.5%. 58.9% of people only spoke English at home. Other languages spoken at home included Mandarin 3.0%, Portuguese 2.8%, Russian 2.8%, Spanish 2.2% and Italian 1.7%. The most common responses for religion in Bondi Junction were No Religion 31.8% and Catholic 21.1%.

Sport and recreation
Bondi Junction is represented in one of the most popular sporting competitions across Australia, the National Rugby League competition, by the local team the Sydney Roosters, officially the Eastern Suburbs District Rugby League Football Club (ESDRLFC). The Junction is known colloquially to residents in the area as "the home of the Roosters".

Local landmarks and heritage listing
Bondi Junction has many heritage-listed buildings and other items.

Waverley Reservoirs on Paul Street is heritage listed at the state level.

The following are some of the locally heritage listed buildings:
 Italianate home used as community health centre, 26 Llandaff Street
 Ben Eden, Paul Street
 Blair Athol, Woodstock Street
 Euston, Woodstock Street
 Charles Terrace, Denison Street
 Glen Mervyn, Denison Street
 Myall, Mill Hill Road
 Cintra, Mill Hill Road
 Congregationalist Church, Botany Street
 Clementson Park, Ebley Street
 Fingleton Reserve, Waverley Crescent
 Hallena, Waverley Street
 Cotswald Hall, Dalley Street
 Waverley Library

References

 
Suburbs of Sydney
Waverley Council